Electoral district X (Croatian: X. izborna jedinica) is one of twelve electoral districts of Croatian Parliament.

Boundaries  
Electoral district X consist of:

 southern part of Split-Dalmatia County including cities and municipalities: Baška Voda, Bol, Brela, Cista Provo, Dugi Rat, Gradac, Hvar, Imotski, Jelsa, Komiža, Lokvičići, Lovreć, Makarska, Milna, Nerežišća, Omiš, Podbablje, Podgora, Podstrana, Postira, Proložac, Pučišća, Runovići, Selca, Solin, Split, Stari Grad, Sućuraj, Supetar, Sutivan, Šestanovac, Šolta, Tučepi, Vis, Vrgorac, Zadvarje, Zagvozd, Zmijavci;
 whole Dubrovnik-Neretva County.

Election

2000 Elections 
 

HSLS - SDP
 Ivan Škarić
 Marin Jurjević
 Vedran Lendić
 Andro Vlahušić
 Tonči Žuvela
 Branka Baletić
 Ante Grabovac
 Vesna Podlipec

HDZ
 Jure Radić
 Ivo Sanader
 Luka Bebić
 Dubravka Šuica
 Ivica Tafra

HSS - LS - HNS - ASH
 Luka Roić

2003 Elections 
 

HDZ
 Ivo Sanader
 Živko Nenadić
 Luka Bebić
 Dubravka Šuica
 Zvonimir Puljić
 Dujomir Marasović
 Branko Bačić

SDP - Libra - LS
 Slavko Linić
 Marin Jurjević
 Neven Mimica
 Jagoda Martić

HNS
 Jakša Marasović

HSP
 Ruža Tomašić

HSS
 Luka Roić

2007 Elections 
 

HDZ
 Ivo Sanader
 Luka Bebić
 Jerko Rošin
 Dubravka Šuica
 Živko Nenadić
 Zvonimir Puljić
 Branko Bačić
 Frano Matušić

SDP
 Željka Antunović
 Marin Jurjević
 Branko Grčić
 Tatjana Šimac-Bonačić
 Arsen Bauk

HSS - HSLS
 Stipo Gabrić

2011 Elections 
 

SDP - HNS - IDS - HSU
 Arsen Bauk
 Branko Grčić
 Marin Jurjević
 Tatjana Šimac-Bonačić
 Tonka Ivčević
 Srđan Gjurković

HDZ - HGS
 Branko Bačić
 Damir Krstičević
 Željko Kerum
 Dujomir Marasović
 Frano Matušić

Independent Ivan Grubišić
 Ivan Grubišić
 Jakša Baloević

HSP AS - HČSP
 Ruža Tomašić

2015 Elections 
 

HDZ - HSS - HSP AS - BUZ - HSLS - HDS - ZDS - HRAST
 Damir Krstičević
 Zlatko Ževrnja
 Branko Bačić
 Milivoj Špika
 Petar Škorić
 Goran Dodig
 Sanja Putica

SDP - HNS - HSU - HL SR - A-HSS - ZS
 Ante Kotromanović
 Branko Grčić
 Arsen Bauk
 Darko Parić

Most
 Božo Petrov
 Ivan Kovačić
 Mario Klubučić

2016 Elections 
 

HDZ - HDS
 Damir Krstičević
 Milan Kujundžić
 Andro Krstulović Opara
 Branko Bačić
 Petar Škorić
 Lovro Kušćević
 Goran Dodig

SDP - HNS - HSS - HSU
 Boris Lalovac
 Branko Grčić
 Arsen Bauk
 Darko Parić

Most
 Božo Petrov
 Ivan Kovačić
 Ivana Ninčević-Lesandrić

2020 Elections 
 

HDZ - HDS
 Vili Beroš
 Branko Bačić
 Blaženko Boban
 Andro Krstulović Opara
 Mato Franković
 Ante Mihanović
 Goran Dodig

SDP - HNS - HSS - HSU
 Arsen Bauk
 Katica Glamuzina
 Branko Grčić

Most
 Božo Petrov
 Ante Kujundžić

References 

Electoral districts in Croatia